Aaron Brown (born 27 July 1992) is a professional rugby league footballer who plays as a second row or loose forward for the Widnes Vikings in the Betfred Championship.

Brown signed for the Dewsbury Rams in October 2012 having previously being named as the Leeds Rhinos U20 player of the year.

In October 2018 Brown joined Sheffield Eagles on a two-year deal. He helped the Eagles by scoring a hat-trick of tries, to win the inaugural 1895 Cup as they defeated Widnes Vikings 36–18 in the final.

In October 2021 Brown signed for Widnes Vikings for the 2022 season.

References

External links
Dewsbury Rams profile

1992 births
Living people
Dewsbury Rams players
English rugby league players
Rugby league locks
Rugby league second-rows
Sheffield Eagles players
Widnes Vikings players